Gopal Baglay, or Gopal Bagalay is an Indian diplomat and currently the Indian High Commissioner to Sri Lanka. He has previously been the Official Spokesperson of the Ministry of External Affairs, and Joint secretary in Prime Minister's Office.

References 

Living people
Indian Foreign Service officers
High Commissioners of India to Sri Lanka
Year of birth missing (living people)